Gusii may refer to:
the Gusii people
the Gusii language